Ineffability is the quality of something that surpasses the capacity of language to express it, often being in the form of a taboo or incomprehensible term. This property is commonly associated with philosophy, aspects of existence, and similar concepts that are inherently "too great", complex or abstract to be communicated adequately. Illogical statements, principles, reasons and arguments may be considered intrinsically ineffable along with impossibilities, contradictions and paradoxes.

Terminology describing the nature of experience cannot be conveyed properly in dualistic symbolic language; it is believed that this knowledge is only held by the individual from which it originates. Profanity and vulgarisms can easily and clearly be stated, but by those who believe they should not be said, they are considered ineffable. Thus, one method of describing something that is ineffable is by using apophasis, i.e. describing what it is not, rather than what it is. An example is the name of God in Judaism, written as YHWH but substituted with Adonai ("the Lord") or HaShem ("the name") when reading.

See also

 Atopy (philosophy)
 Apophatic (or "negative") theology
 Creator ineffabilis (Christian prayer)
 Ideasthesia
 Implicit knowledge
 Meaning (linguistics)
 True name
 Whereof one cannot speak, thereof one must be silent

References

Religious philosophical concepts